The Skokie Shops are CTA rail shops located at Oakton Street and Hamlin Avenue in Skokie, Illinois. Currently, the Skokie Shops are used for rail maintenance, inspections, cleaning, repair work, and overhaul of CTA railcars.

References 

Chicago Transit Authority